VOID is the fifth studio album by the punk rock band Vanna. It was released in 2014 on Pure Noise Records. The album was the band's first release on the record company. It marks a change to their sound, as it is more melodic and aggressive than their previous releases. The band streamed the album on SoundCloud in full a week before release. The album had its highest release and first appearance on the Billboard top 200, with sales over 1800+ copies and charting at #157 along with charting on Heatseeker (#20). This was attributed to their successful performance on the 2014 Vans Warped Tour.

Track listing

Personnel

Vanna
Davey Muise – vocals 
Nicholas Lambert – guitar
Joel Pastuszak – guitar, vocals
Shawn Marquis – bass, vocals
Eric Gross – drums

Production
Produced, mixed and mastered by Will Putney at The Machine Shop, Weehawken, New Jersey
Engineered by Randy LeBeouf
Edited by Tom Smith Jr.
Artwork by Nicholas Lambert

References

2014 albums
Vanna (band) albums
Pure Noise Records albums